Anaphalis alpicola is a species of flowering plants within the family Asteraceae. It is found in Japan (Hokkaido, Honshu).

References

Flora of Japan
alpicola